Marc Tarabella (born 11 March 1963) is a Belgian politician who has been serving as a Member of the European Parliament for the French Community of Belgium with the Parti Socialiste, part of the Socialist Group. In February 2023 he was charged with corruption and money laundering in connection with the Qatar corruption scandal at the European Parliament.

Early life
Tarabella was born in Ougrée, a suburb of Seraing from a family originally from Versilia, Italy.

Education
 1986: Degree in sociology, University of Liège
 1988: Seconded to the office of the Premier of the Walloon Region
 1990: Customer adviser, General Savings and Retirement Fund

Political career

Career in national politics
 1988–1994: Member of the Anthisnes Municipal Council
 since 1994: Mayor of Anthisnes
 2000: Member of the executive of the Huy-Waremme Federation of the Socialist Party
 2003: President of the Rural Foundation of Wallonia
 2002: Belgian coordinator of the committees supporting Ingrid Betancourt

Member of the European Parliament
In parliament, Tarabella sits on the European Parliament's Committee on Agriculture and Rural Development. He is a substitute for the Committee on Employment and Social Affairs and a vice-chair of the Delegation for relations with the countries of Southeast Asia and the Association of Southeast Asian Nations (ASEAN).

In January 2021, Tarabella became a member of the Italian left-wing party Article One.

Amid the Qatar corruption scandal at the European Parliament in late 2022, Belgian police searched Tarabella's home. He subsequently suspended himself from the S&D group, and his Walloon Socialist party revoked his membership. He also stepped down as member and vice chair of the European Parliament’s delegation to Qatar and other Arabian Peninsula countries.

In February 2023 the European Parliament voted to waive immunity for Tarabella. He was subsequently arrested, charged with corruption and money laundering and remanded into custody. He denied any wrongdoing.

See also

 2004 European Parliament election in Belgium

References

External links

 
 
 

1963 births
Living people
Belgian sociologists
MEPs for Belgium 2004–2009
MEPs for Belgium 2009–2014
MEPs for Belgium 2014–2019
MEPs for Belgium 2019–2024
Socialist Party (Belgium) MEPs
People from Anthisnes
People from Seraing
University of Liège alumni
Belgian people of Italian descent